Hunters of the Lost City is a children's fantasy novel by Kali Wallace.

Synopsis 
Twelve-year old Octavia grows up in the town of Vittoria, the last remaining enclave of humanity after a cataclysmic war and pandemic destroyed civilization. The town is surrounded by woods populated with Ferox, magically animated constructs which prey on humans. She aspires to become a Hunter like her mother and sister.

After meeting Sima, a girl who travelled to Vittoria from elsewhere, Octavia learns that there is a world of humans outside of the town's walls.

Reception 
The novel received mostly positive reviews from critics. Publishers Weekly wrote that "Richly detailed magical lore, gripping action, and frightening fantastical creatures are grounded by well-rounded characters and the girls’ blossoming friendship." Kirkus Reviews gave the novel a starred review, praising its heroine and writing.

References 

Quirk Books books
Children's fantasy novels
2022 children's books